Kermit Roosevelt Cofer (1908 – 1989) was a justice of the Supreme Court of Mississippi. He served on the court from 1978 to 1980. He had a wife and daughter.

Career
Kofer was appointed to the court from Yalobusha County, Mississippi.

After William H. Inzer died on February 21, 1978, Cofer was appointed on March 15, 1978 by Governor Cliff Finch. Cofer lived in Water Valley, Mississippi. He had been a chancellor since 1959. He  was unopposed in the 1979 election to fill the remaining year of Inzer's term. Cofer "declined to run for a full term, after being appointed to the court in 1978".

See also
List of justices of the Supreme Court of Mississippi

References

External links

1908 births
1989 deaths
People from Water Valley, Mississippi
Justices of the Mississippi Supreme Court
Burials in Mississippi